Bald's eyesalve is an early medieval English medicine recorded in the 10th-century Anglo-Saxon Bald's Leechbook.  It is described as a treatment for a "wen", a lump in the eye.  The ingredients include garlic, another Allium (it is unclear which), wine and bovine bile, crushed and mixed together before being left to stand for nine days.

Description

Bald's Eyesalve is a medicine described in Bald's Leechbook, a 10th-century Anglo-Saxon medical text written in Old English that survives in the collection of the British Library. The identity of Bald is not known but he is named in the work by a note that states "Bald owns this book which he ordered Cild to compile". The eyesalve is described as a treatment for a  "wen" (lump) in the eye ("most likely a sty: an infection of an eyelash follicle"). Bald's Leechbook includes other treatments such as agrimony boiled in milk to combat impotency and the same substance boiled in Welsh beer to induce impotency.

The recipe for the eyesalve consists of equal parts of garlic, crushed by mortar and pestle, and "cropleac" (another Allium species, the translation from Old English is ambiguous; modern reproductions have used onion or leek) and equal parts (the text is ambiguous as to whether these ingredients are equal with the Allium components) of wine and oxgall (bovine bile). The mixture is left to stand in a brass or bronze container for nine days before being wrung through a cloth and clarified. The text states that the medicine should be stored in a horn and applied to the infected area with a feather at night time.

Recipe translation

References

Further reading 
 
 

Old English medicine